Gageac may refer to:

La Roque-Gageac, commune in the Dordogne
Gageac-et-Rouillac, commune in the Dordogne
Château de Gageac, castle in Gageac-et-Rouillac